Koolarrow Records is an independent record label based in San Francisco, set up by Faith No More's bass guitarist Billy Gould.

Current artists 

 7notas, 7colores
 Alexander Hacke
 Brujeria
 Como Asesinar a Felipes
 Don Cikuta
 Dureforsog
 Dubioza kolektiv
 Flattbush
 Hog Molly
 Kultur Shock
 La Plebe
 Mexican Dubwiser
 Naive
 Not from There
 The Talking Book
 Unjust

Spanglish artists 

 Announce Predictions
 Aztlan Underground
 Banana Hammock
 Calavera
 Chicle Atomico
 Como Asesinar a Felipes
 Control Machete
 Fractura
 La Flor Del Lingo
 Lil Rudy G.
 El Peyote Asesino
 Puya
 Resorte

See also 
 List of record labels

References

External links
 Official site

American independent record labels
Heavy metal record labels